Superman Was A Rocker is the 9th studio album from singer-songwriter Robert Pollard. It was released on January 29, 2008. Superman Was a Rocker marks the first LP released by Pollard's Happy Jack Rock Records label . It differs from Pollard's past solo albums in that it is very lo-fi in comparison to his more polished releases.

Background 
The album was created by adding vocals to previously unused instrumentals, spanning nearly three decades of dormant recordings. The track "Back to the Farm" opens with a radio conversation supposedly between Guided by Voices band members and a southern speaking critic of their music. Many of the GBV band members appear on the recording as a result of the extended periods of the work.

According to the Rockathon Music website:
"Robert Pollard's Superman Was A Rocker is a return to old ways for Bob. This mini-album (13 songs, 30 minutes) finds Bob using recording methods that he hasn't engaged in since the old GBV days."

"Bob recently poured through a bunch of old cassette tapes of his and found some great instrumentals that he either wrote or co-wrote, and never used. He decided to go into the studio and put vocals (and melodies!) over them."

Track listing

"Another Man's Blood"
"Go Down First"
"Back to the Farm" (instrumental)
"Substitute Heaven"
"Prince Alphabet"
"You Drove the Snake Crazy"
"Surveillance"
"Fascination Attempt"
"Love Your Spaceman"
"Jumping"
"St. Leroy"
"Peacock"
"More Hot Dogs Please"

Personnel 

 Robert Pollard - Vocals, guitar, piano, producer
 Jim Pollard - Bass, drums, guitar, 
 Tobin Sprout - Drums
 Mitch Mitchell - Bass, guitar
 John Bert Dodson - Drum machine, guitar

Other/production 

 Kevin March - Engineer, various Instruments
 Todd Tobias - Audio Engineer, Producer, Vocal Engineer

References

2008 albums
Robert Pollard albums